Ertuğrul Tekşen (born 25 April 2000) is a Danish-born Turkish professional footballer who plays as a forward for TFF Third League club Belediye Kütahyaspor.

Club career

Early years
Tekşen started playing football at an early age in Ishøj with local club SB 50. He soon moved to the Brøndby youth academy, where he initially struggled. At under-13 level, he was not among the best players and his development stagnated, which he later attributed to a poor relationship to his coaches. The following year new academy coaches were hired, and as an under-14 level player Tekşen began progressing, which made him stay at the club. In October 2016, as part of the under-17 team, he signed a two-year contract extension, which would keep him at the club until under-19 level.

Lyngby
During the summer of 2019, Tekşen moved to the under-19 team of Lyngby Boldklub, after two successive unsuccessful trials at Nykøbing FC and FC Roskilde. He made his first-team debut on 29 November 2019 in a Danish Superliga matchup against FC Nordsjælland, coming on as a 60th-minute substitute for Emilio Simonsen as the match ended 1–1. On 10 March 2020, Tekşen signed a one-year contract extension with Lyngby keeping him part of the club until at least 31 December 2020.

Konyaspor
On 9 January 2021, it was announced that Tekşen would sign a two-and-a-half-year contract with Turkish Süper Lig club Konyaspor. He was officially presented by the club on 13 January.

On 21 January, he was sent on loan to the feeder club 1922 Konyaspor on a one-and-a-half-year deal. He made his debut for the club on 27 January, coming on as a substitute in the 79th minute of a TFF Second League match against Sakaryaspor, which ended in a 1–1 draw. He scored his first goal for the club on 3 February in a 2–0 win over Karacabey Belediyespor, which was also his first senior goal.

He had his contract terminated by mutual consent in the summer of 2021.

Næstved
In September 2021, Tekşen returned to Denmark to sign for Næstved Boldklub competing in the third tier 2nd Division, after a successful trial. He made his debut on 3 October in a 2–1 win over FA 2000.

Niğde Anadolu
On 14 February 2022, Tekşen signed with TFF Second League club Niğde Anadolu. His debut for the club came on the same day, coming off the bench in the 76th minute in a 3–0 home loss to Adıyamanspor. On 17 April, he scored his first goal for Niğde Anadolu in a 2–0 victory against Sarıyer.

Belediye Kütahyaspor
Tekşen joined TFF Third League club Belediye Kütahyaspor on 31 July 2022, signing a two-year contract.

International career
Tekşen has represented Turkey at under-16 level, gaining five caps in which he scored one goal.

Career statistics

References

External links
Ertuğrul Tekşen at Mackolik.com (in Turkish)

2000 births
Living people
People from Ishøj Municipality
Turkish footballers
Turkey youth international footballers
Danish men's footballers
Danish people of Turkish descent
Association football forwards
Ishøj IF players
Brøndby IF players
Lyngby Boldklub players
Konyaspor footballers
1922 Konyaspor footballers
Næstved Boldklub players
Niğde Anadolu FK footballers
Danish Superliga players
Danish 2nd Division players
TFF Second League players
TFF Third League players
Sportspeople from the Capital Region of Denmark